Wawyachtonoc (also rendered Wyachtonok, Wawayachtonoc, and Wyaghtonok) were an Algonquian-speaking Native American people indigenous to east central New York and northwest Connecticut.

In 1687, the Wyachtonok,originally subgroup of Paugussett, joined the Mohican Confederacy.

The majority of the Wawyachtonoc were converted to Christianity, beginning in 1740, by Moravian missionaries. During this period Wawyachtonoc populations became concentrated at the Moravian missions at Shekomeko and Schaghticoke.

In the 1830s the some Wawyachtonoc were displaced to Wisconsin. These Wawyachtonoc descendants are now part of the Stockbridge–Munsee Community and Brothertown Indians of Wisconsin, while those that remained in Connecticut are part of the Schaghticoke Tribal Nation, a state-recognized tribe.

Name 
The ethnonym Wawyachtonoc is often translated as "eddy people" or "people of the curved channel."

Territory 
The traditional territory of the Wawyachtonoc extended throughout what is now Columbia and Duchess County New York, and Litchfield County, Connecticut.

Villages 

 Weantinock, the tribe's primary village, situated along the Housatonic River near present New Milford
 Wechquadnach, meaning "wrapped around by the mountain," on the Eastern side of Indian Lake, Litchfield County
 Shekomeko, meaning "great village," 2 miles south of present Pine Plains, NY
 Weataug, meaning "wigwam place," likely on the Housatonic River between Washining Lake and Canaan, CT, near present Salisbury
 Bantam
 Pomperaug

References 

Native American history of Connecticut
Native American tribes in Connecticut
History of Fairfield County, Connecticut